Hatch Beauchamp is a village and civil parish in Somerset, England, situated  south east of Taunton in the Somerset West and Taunton district.  The village has a population of 620.

History

The manor of "Hache" dates from Saxon times and became the caput of a feudal barony after the Norman Conquest of England in 1066, when it was granted to Robert, Count of Mortain (d.1095) by his half-brother William the Conqueror.  Hatch Beauchamp is described under the title of Terra Comitis Mortoniensis ("lands of the Count/Earl of Mortain") as follows: "Robert holds Hache of the Earl:  of meadow,  of wood; arable, six carucates; in demesne, two carucates, and three servants, eleven villanes, four cottagers with three ploughs." This Robert who was the vassal of the Earl was Robert FitzIvo. Six years later in 1092, the manor was in the hands of Robert of Beauchamp, who may have been the same person.  The Beauchamp family were loyal allies of William the Conqueror, and had been granted large estates in Somerset and Bedfordshire.

Hatch Beauchamp is noted around 1300 as having a market every Thursday, but this has long since vanished.  The area — along with most of the South West of England, was staunchly Royalist in the English Civil War, although the local town of Taunton was a Parliamentary stronghold, and was besieged.

The village today contains an inn, and a manor house, Hatch Court, built around 1750, in the Palladian architectural style.  Prior to this, a great house had existed on the same site since the Middle Ages, but had fallen into ruin by the 17th century.  The inn dates from around the mid-18th century.

Hatch Beauchamp is the burial place of Colonel John Rouse Merriott Chard, VC, RE (21 December 1847 – 1 November 1897) a British soldier who won the Victoria Cross for his role in the defence of Rorke's Drift in 1879.

Governance
The parish council has responsibility for local issues, including setting an annual precept (local rate) to cover the council's operating costs and producing annual accounts for public scrutiny. The parish council evaluates local planning applications and works with the local police, district council officers, and neighbourhood watch groups on matters of crime, security, and traffic. The parish council's role also includes initiating projects for the maintenance and repair of parish facilities, as well as consulting with the district council on the maintenance, repair, and improvement of highways, drainage, footpaths, public transport, and street cleaning. Conservation matters (including trees and listed buildings) and environmental issues are also the responsibility of the council.

The village falls within the non-metropolitan district of Somerset West and Taunton, which was established on 1 April 2019. It was previously in the district of Taunton Deane, which was formed on 1 April 1974 under the Local Government Act 1972, and part of Taunton Rural District before that. The district council is responsible for local planning and building control, local roads, council housing, environmental health, markets and fairs, refuse collection and recycling, cemeteries and crematoria, leisure services, parks, and tourism.

Somerset County Council is responsible for running the largest and most expensive local services such as education, social services, libraries, main roads, public transport, policing and fire services, trading standards, waste disposal and strategic planning.

Hatch Beauchamp is in the 'Neroche' electoral ward. Although this is the most populous area, the ward itself stretches west to Corfe and south to Staple Fitzpaine. The total population of the ward at the 2011 census was 2,164.

It is also part of the Taunton Deane county constituency represented in the House of Commons of the Parliament of the United Kingdom. It elects one Member of Parliament (MP) by the first past the post system of election.

Landmarks

Hatch Court, which was built around 1755 by Thomas Prowse for John Collins, contains a small military museum commemorating the life and work of the renowned Brigadier Hamilton Gault, great-uncle of the present owner, MP for Taunton, and member of the Quebec Chamber of Commerce, as well as a decorated Boer War hero.  Hamilton Gault was the founder of the British Empire's last privately raised regiment, the Princess Patricia's Canadian Light Infantry.
The regiment saw action in both World Wars, and were the first Allied force to enter Amsterdam in early 1945.  They were more recently in action against the Taliban in Afghanistan, as part of Operation Anaconda in 2002.

Religious sites

In Hatch Beauchamp the Norman Church of St John the Baptist has a crenellated 3-stage tower from about 1500. It displays crocketed pinnacles, a pierced parapet with quatrefoils and arcades in the merlons and gargoyles. The church has diagonal buttresses to support the tower whereas, in other churches within this group, angle buttresses are the norm. The buttresses, which finish in the belfry stage, support small detached shafts which rise upwards to form the outside subsidiary pinnacles of each corner cluster.

Notable residents of Hatch Beauchamp
 Robert de Beauchamp (d. 1252)
 John Chard, as a lieutenant awarded the VC for his part in the defence of Rorke's Drift in the Anglo-Zulu War of 1879
 Anson Baronets
 Justin Langer, former Australian opening batsman and Somerset CCC

Rail

In the Victorian era, Hatch was connected to the national railway grid in 1866 as part of the Bristol and Exeter Railway. The village had a Chalet-style station, known as Hatch, on the Chard Branch Line which closed in 1963. In 1962, following the Beeching Report, railway services ceased to operate completely, although the railway station remains.

References

External links

 Hatch Beauchamp Charity Fireworks Display
 Hatch Beauchamp History 
 Village website

Villages in Taunton Deane
Civil parishes in Somerset